DreamNote, is a South Korean  girl group formed by iMe KOREA. They debuted on November 7, 2018 with their debut single album Dreamlike. The group currently consists of six members: Sumin, Eunjo, Lara, Miso, Youi and Boni.

Members
Adapted from the group's Japan official website and Makestar.
 Boni – vocalist, dancer
 Youi – leader, vocalist, dancer
 Lara – vocalist
 Miso – vocalist
 Sumin – rapper, dancer, vocalist
 Eunjo – vocalist
 Former
 Habin
 Hanbyeol

Timeline

Discography

Single albums

Singles

Soundtrack appearances

Other singles

Videography

Music videos

Awards and nominations

Notes

References

External links

 
 Japan Official Site
 Makestar

2018 establishments in South Korea
South Korean girl groups
K-pop music groups
Musical groups established in 2018
South Korean pop music groups
South Korean dance music groups
Musical groups from Seoul